The 2021 Campeonato Brasileiro Série A (officially the Brasileirão Assaí 2021 for sponsorship reasons) was the 65th season of the Campeonato Brasileiro Série A, the top level of professional football in Brazil, and the 18th edition in a double round-robin since its establishment in 2003. The competition began on 29 May and ended on 9 December 2021. Flamengo were the defending champions.

The top six teams as well as the 2021 Copa do Brasil champions qualified for the Copa Libertadores. The next six best-placed teams not qualified for Copa Libertadores qualified for the Copa Sudamericana and the last four were relegated to Série B for 2022.

Atlético Mineiro were the champions, winning their second Série A title on 2 December 2021 with two matches to spare after they defeated Bahia by a 3–2 score.

Teams

Twenty teams compete in the league – the top sixteen teams from the previous season, as well as four teams promoted from the Série B.

América Mineiro and Chapecoense became the first two clubs to be promoted on 12 January 2021 after a 0–0 draw against Náutico and a 2–1 win against Figueirense, respectively. Chapecoense had an immediate return to the first division after a season away, while América Mineiro returned after a two-year absence. Cuiabá was promoted for the first time ever on 22 January 2021. The final team to achieve promotion were Juventude on 29 January 2021, sealing a return to the top flight after a thirteen-year absence.

Number of teams by state

Stadiums and locations

Personnel and kits

Foreign players
The clubs can have a maximum of five foreign players in their Campeonato Brasileiro squads per match, but there is no limit of foreigners in the clubs' squads.

Players holding Brazilian dual nationality
They do not take foreign slot.

  Diego Costa (Atlético Mineiro)
  Johnny Cardoso (Internacional)
  Chico (Juventude)
  Éder (São Paulo)

Managerial changes

Notes

Standings

League table

Positions by round
The table lists the positions of teams after each week of matches.In order to preserve chronological evolvements, any postponed matches are not included to the round at which they were originally scheduled, but added to the full round they were played immediately afterwards.

Results

Season statistics

Top scorers

Source: Soccerway

Hat-tricks

Notes
4 Player scored 4 goals(H) – Home team(A) – Away team

Assists

Source: Soccerway

Clean sheets

Source: FBref.com

Awards

Monthly awards

Annual awards

References 

2021 in Brazilian football
Brazil
Campeonato Brasileiro Série A seasons